The Bertram class was a two-ship class of air-sea rescue vessels of the Royal Australian Navy. Purchased to replace the old World War II class of 63-foot air-sea rescue vessel, they were found to be unsuitable for the proposed role. The vessels were disposed of in 1988.

Ships
38101, launched in 1966 and in service in 1967
38102, launched in 1966 and in service in 1967

Citations

References
 

Ship classes
Auxiliary ships of the Royal Australian Navy